"Each Minute Seems a Million Years" is a country music song written by Alton "Cook" Watson and sung by Eddy Arnold, billed as "Eddy Arnold, The Tennessee Plowboy and His Guitar". It was released in 1945 on the RCA Victor label (catalog no. 20-2067-A) with "You Must Walk the Line" as the "B" side. In debuted on the Billboard folk chart on June 30, 1945 and peaked at No. 5.  It was Arnold's first of 128 hit singles for Arnold.

References

Eddy Arnold songs
1945 songs